Switzerland participated at the 2010 Winter Olympics in Vancouver, British Columbia, Canada. 146 athletes entered 14 sports (all except short track speed skating).

Medalists

Alpine skiing

Men

Women

Men's team

Biathlon

Bobsleigh

Switzerland qualified three sleighs in the two-man event, two sleighs in the two-woman event and two sleighs in the four-man event. Switzerland lost two of its two-man sleighs after driver Beat Hefti and brakeman Jörg Egger suffered injuries during the training runs.

Two-man

Two-woman

Four-man

Cross-country skiing

Men

Women

Curling

Men's tournament

Men's team
CC St Galler Bär, St Gallen.

*Throws second rocks

Standings

Round-robin

Draw 1

Draw 3

Draw 4

Draw 5

Draw 6

Draw 8

Draw 9

Draw 10

Draw 12

Semifinal

Bronze medal game

Women's tournament

Women's team
Davos CC, Davos.

Standings

Round-robin

Draw 1
Tuesday, February 16, 2:00 PM

Draw 2
Wednesday, February 17, 9:00 AM

Draw 3
Wednesday, February 17, 7:00 PM

Draw 6
Friday, February 19, 7:00 PM

Draw 7
Saturday, February 20, 2:00 PM

Draw 8
Sunday, February 21, 9:00 AM

Draw 10
Monday, February 22, 2:00 PM

Draw 11
Tuesday, February 23, 9:00 AM

Draw 12
Tuesday, February 23, 7:00 PM

Semifinal
Thursday, February 25, 9:00 AM

Bronze medal game
Friday, February 26, 9:00 AM

Figure skating

Freestyle skiing

Switzerland entered 14 athletes into freestyle skiing events, 6 in the aerials and 8 in ski cross.

Aerials

Ski cross

Ice hockey

Men's tournament

Roster

Group play
Switzerland played in Group A.
Round-robin
All times are local (UTC-8).

Standings

Final rounds
Qualification playoff

Quarterfinal

Women's tournament

Roster

Group play
Switzerland played in Group A.
Round-robin
All times are local (UTC-8).

Standings

Final rounds
Fifth place semifinal

Fifth place game

Luge

Nordic combined

Switzerland also competed in the individual large hill event and the team event.

Skeleton

Women

Men

Ski jumping

Notes: PQ indicates a skier was pre-qualified for the final, based on entry rankings. Q indicates a skier qualified for the next round. DNQ indicates a skier did not qualify for the next round.

Snowboarding

Halfpipe

Parallel giant slalom

Snowboard cross

Speed skating

Men

See also
 Switzerland at the 2010 Winter Paralympics

References

2010 in Swiss sport
Nations at the 2010 Winter Olympics
2010